Cao Xiaobo (born 25 May 1967) is a Chinese sailor who competed in the 1996 Summer Olympics. He is from Qingdao.

References

1967 births
Living people
Olympic sailors of China
Chinese male sailors (sport)
Sailors at the 1996 Summer Olympics – Laser
Asian Games medalists in sailing
Sportspeople from Qingdao
Sailors at the 1990 Asian Games
Sailors at the 1994 Asian Games
Sailors at the 1998 Asian Games
Medalists at the 1990 Asian Games
Medalists at the 1994 Asian Games
Medalists at the 1998 Asian Games
Asian Games silver medalists for China
Asian Games bronze medalists for China
20th-century Chinese people